The Roulette Tour is the fourth headlining concert tour by the English boy band Blue. On 27 March 2013, the group announced live on  British daytime magazine programme This Morning that they would be embarking on their first headlining tour after reuniting later on in the year. After one concert in London, the tour kicked off in Germany with nine dates and additional five dates one each in Austria, Switzerland, France and two in Italy all in late May and early June. The second leg led the tour through further twenty-one dates in United Kingdom. In 2018, the tour led to the release of The Roulette Tour 2013 (Live at The Hammersmith Apollo), their second live album.

Critical reception
Sam Rigby from Digital Spy called the show "a welcome trip down memory lane." He found that "despite the fact that their new material is largely forgettable, Blue succeed in giving their fans a welcome trip down memory lane. Whether they can sustain their comeback remains to be seen, but for now, it's just nice to see those dance moves on show again."

Set list
This set list is representative of the 2 May 2013 show in  London.

First leg 

Act 1
"Sorry Seems to Be the Hardest Word"
"Breathe Easy"
"U Make Me Wanna"
"Break My Heart"
"I Can"
"Best in Me"
"Don't Treat Me Like a Fool"
"Long Time"

Act 2
"All Rise"
"Too Close"
"Fly by II"
"Bubblin'"
"We've Got Tonight"
"Guilty"
"If You Come Back"
"Hurt Lovers"

Encores
"Curtain Falls"
"One Love"
"Without You"
"Sing for Me"

Second leg 

Act 1
"We've Got Tonight" (Single Remix)
"Bubblin"' (Single Remix)
"Fly By II"
"Too Close"
"Ayo"
"Black Box"
"U Make Me Wanna"
"Sing for Me" (Single Remix)

Act 2
"Paradise"
"Break My Heart"
"Sorry Seems to Be the Hardest Word"
"If You Come Back"
"Broken"
"Without You"
"Break You Down"
"Heart on My Sleeve"
"Hurt Lovers"
"One Love"

Encores
"Breathe Easy"
"All Rise"

Notes
The versions of "We've Got Tonight", "Bubblin'" and "Sing for Me" played on tour are different to the album versions:
"We've Got Tonight" and "Bubblin'" include a new middle-eight rap from Simon Webbe.
"Sing for Me" jumps into a club remix following the second chorus.

Tour dates

References

2013 concert tours